The Cudahy Depot is a historic railroad station built in 1893 by the Chicago and Northwestern Railway in Cudahy, Wisconsin.

History 
After Patrick Cudahy's meat-packing partnership with John Plankinton ended, Patrick and his brother John bought land south of Milwaukee to start a new meat-packing operation. They needed transportation, so they built near the Chicago and Northwestern's existing rail line, and they persuaded to the railroad to add a depot near their plant, even donating land for the depot.

The station opened in September 1892. In 1893, a Queen Anne Revival depot designed by architect J. B. Berry was added to the station. The depot, located on the southbound platform, included separate men's and women's waiting rooms, a telegrapher's office, and storage space in the attic. Characteristics that mark it Queen Anne are the stained glass windows, the bay window at the end, the ornate brackets under the eaves, and the chimneys. 

Service to the station ended by 1957 and the depot was condemned in 1971 due to its state of disrepair. The following year the Cudahy Historical Society was formed to restore and preserve the building as a museum and community center and in 1978 the historical society acquired the deed to the Depot. In 1983 it became a Milwaukee County Registered Landmark and was added to the National Register of Historic Places in 2013.

References

Buildings and structures in Milwaukee County, Wisconsin
Railway stations on the National Register of Historic Places in Wisconsin
Queen Anne architecture in Wisconsin
1892 establishments in Wisconsin
Railway stations in the United States opened in 1892
Former Chicago and North Western Railway stations
National Register of Historic Places in Milwaukee County, Wisconsin
Former railway stations in Wisconsin